Jenkin Whiteside (1772September 25, 1822) was an attorney who served as a United States Senator from Tennessee.

Biography
Jenkin Whiteside was born in Lancaster, Pennsylvania. His father, Thomas Whiteside (1742–1823), was born in County Tyrone in Ulster and settled in the Province of Pennsylvania. Jenkin Whiteside studied the law in Pennsylvania and was admitted to the bar there. Moving to Knoxville, Tennessee, he commenced practice there, and in 1801 and 1802 served as a Knoxville commissioner.

In 1809, he was elected by the Tennessee General Assembly to replace Daniel Smith, who had resigned from the United States Senate, serving until his own resignation on October 8, 1811, when he resumed the practice of law.

He was succeeded as senator by George W. Campbell. In 1821, he died in Nashville and was buried in Columbia, TN.

References

1772 births
1822 deaths
American people of Scotch-Irish descent
Tennessee Democratic-Republicans
Democratic-Republican Party United States senators
United States senators from Tennessee
Politicians from Knoxville, Tennessee
Politicians from Lancaster, Pennsylvania